Billy Glading was a professional lacrosse player with the Washington Bayhawks of Major League Lacrosse, and the Philadelphia Wings of the National Lacrosse League.

Professional career 
2010 Season (Chesapeake): As a captain, played in 8 games and recorded 5 goals. Helped guide the Bayhawks to a 2010 MLL Title.

2009 Season (Washington): As a captain, played in all 12 games and led all defensive midfielders in the league with a career high 10 goals.

2008 Season (Washington): Played in all 12 games and recorded 6 goals and 4 assists.

2006 Season (Boston): Played in all 12 games at midfield.  Glading scored 6 goals and had 4 assists while picking up 24 ground balls on the season.

2005 Season (Boston): Played in 2 games in his first season with the Cannons, recorded one goal vs. the Baltimore Bayhawks.

College career 
Played college lacrosse at the University of Virginia.  Won the 2003 NCAA Championship while being named a Third Team All American the same year.  Was the ACC Tournament MVP with 5 goals in Virginia's win over Duke.  Awarded the team MVP award in 2003 while scoring 24 goals that season. Joined the University of Virginia men's basketball team for the 2003-2004 season.

External links 

 
 https://web.archive.org/web/20080705055132/http://www.washingtonbayhawks.com/team/roster/index.html?player_id=70
 http://www.oursportscentral.com/services/releases/?id=3651892

References 

Major League Lacrosse players
1981 births
Living people
Virginia Cavaliers men's lacrosse players
Gonzaga College High School alumni